Virginia Buika (born in Alcalá de Henares, Spain) is a Spanish musician, actress, director and producer. She is of Equatoguinean descent.

References

External links
 Official Interview
 World Music Central Biography
 Don´t You Cry La Vida Es Un Carnaval Music EP
 Buika's Music
 Buika Productions

1986 births
Living people
People from Alcalá de Henares
Spanish people of Bubi descent
Spanish people of Equatoguinean descent
Singers from the Community of Madrid
Spanish women musicians
21st-century Spanish singers
21st-century women musicians